The Men's Triple Jump athletics events for the 2012 Summer Paralympics took place at the London Olympic Stadium from August 31 to September 8. A total of 3 events were contested over this distance for 3 different classifications.

Schedule

Results

F11

F12

F46

References

Athletics at the 2012 Summer Paralympics
2012 in men's athletics